Al Rayyan Sporting Club Sarafand is a football club based in Sarafand, Sidon District, Lebanon, that competes in the .

History 
In 2003–04, Rayyan gained promotion from the Lebanese Second Division; they finished eighth in the 2004–05 Lebanese Premier League, and avoided relegation on head-to-head results with Sagesse. After finishing ninth in 2005–06, avoiding relegation by one place, Rayyan were relegated back to the Second Division, after they finished in 11th, below Tripoli on head-to-head results.

References

Al Rayyan SC Sarafand
Football clubs in Lebanon